Death Nurse 2 is a 1988 slasher film written and directed by Nick Millard. It is the sequel to the 1987 film Death Nurse.

Plot 

Picking up where the prequel ended, Death Nurse 2 opens with Lieutenant Cal Bedowski demanding to be let into Shady Palms Clinic, due to having just discovered human remains in the facility's garage. Nurse Edith Mortley opens the door, stabs the lieutenant, and has her brother, Doctor Gordon Mortley, place the man's body in the garage. Edith then explains that disposing of corpses in the garage is the perfect system, as they will be eaten by the rats that infest it, and the rats will then be killed and fed to unknowing patients of the Mortleys.

At city hall, social services worker John Sawyer is pressured by Sergeant David Gallagher into finding somewhere that will take in Brownie, a violent and alcoholic vagrant who has been harassing local merchants. John picks up Brownie (using liquor to pacify her) and drops her off at Shady Palms. When Edith tries to confiscate Brownie's belongings, the woman attacks her, so Edith stabs her. The seemingly dead Brownie is dumped in the garage, but she recovers, and knifes Gordon (leaving him confined to a bed for the rest of the film) before being finished off with a cleaver by Edith. Edith treats Gordon's wounds, and while she does so, it is revealed that Gordon is just a veterinarian, and that Edith was kicked out of nursing school.

Sawyer sweet talks Edith into admitting another deranged vagrant into Shady Palms, a Polish immigrant named Mischa Rudinski. Shortly after Mischa arrives, Shady Palms is visited by Charity Chandler, twin sister of Sawyer's predecessor Faith Chandler, who was murdered by Edith. After Charity, who is looking into the disappearance of her sister, leaves, Edith murders Mischa, having grown tired of listening to his incessant anti-socialist rants.

Suspicious of Shady Palms, Charity seeks aid from Sergeant Gallagher, but he is of no help, simply telling Charity that he may question Edith if Faith does not reappear in a day or two. Taking matters into her own hands, Charity sneaks into Shady Palms, and is stabbed to death by Edith after finding the bodies in the garage. Immediately after Edith kills Charity, she receives a call from Sergeant Gallagher, who makes an appointment to speak to her about Faith. Edith tries to cover-up the smell of Gordon's and her victims with lime, but this backfires when the rats that were feeding on the bodies are driven out into the street by the substance, dragging pieces of human tissue with them. This prompts Sergeant Gallagher to get a warrant to scour Shady Palms. When Gallagher appears with the warrant, Edith slumps on a couch, and wordlessly sulks as Gordon calls to her from his room.

Cast 

 Priscilla Alden as Nurse Edith Mortley
 Albert Eskinazi as Doctor Gordon Mortley
 Frances Millard as Charity Chandler/Faith Chandler
 Irmgard Millard as Brownie
 Nick Millard as Sergeant David Gallagher
 Fred Sarra as Lieutenant Cal Bedowski

DVD release 

Slasher // Video released Death Nurse 2 and its predecessor on DVD in 2012. Limited to 997 copies, the DVD contains features such as two commentaries, interviews, and a short film titled Brownie Goes Shopping.

Reception 

Trash Film Guru's Ryan C. stated, "This is quite likely the most blatant, no-bones-about-it, complete waste of time ever put together by anyone for any reason, yet it never manages to be outright boring even though any rational analysis dictates that it certainly should be". In a review for Video Junkie Strikes Back from Beyond the Grave, William S. Wilson referred to Death Nurse 2 as a heavily padded and hilariously inept "assault on the senses".

Justin McKinney of The Bloody Pit of Horror gave Death Nurse 2 a 1 out 4, and wrote, "Possibly behind only Jerry Warren, Millard may actually be one of horror cinema's thriftiest filmmakers, seeing as how he managed to slap together a half dozen 80s horror features using next to no money, a consumer grade camcorder, his friends and family as 'actors' and a bare minimum of new footage. Here, he again liberally recycles scenes from both Criminally Insane (1973) and Satan's Black Wedding (1974); passing them off as Edith's nightmares. Since this is a follow-up, he's also able to pad things out even further by including clips from the first Death Nurse to help push the run-time up to a paltry 60 minutes. Again, there's a new title card for the film, but the same credits from Criminally Insane are re-run. The music from that film is also reused. It's set in the same exact Pepto Bismol-colored San Francisco house the other movies are set in, features most of the same 'actors' from the other movies and features the same aluminum foil-covered weapons for the close-up hacking/stabbing scenes. There are countless zoom shots, many close-ups of Edith's scowling face and numerous scenes of people sitting, sleeping, lounging on a couch or walking through the house that never seem to end".

References

External links 

 

1988 direct-to-video films
American sequel films
Camcorder films
1988 horror films
American exploitation films
American serial killer films
Medical-themed films
American comedy horror films
1980s English-language films
Films about alcoholism
Films about con artists
Films shot in California
Films about mental health
American independent films
American black comedy films
Direct-to-video horror films
Films about homelessness
Films set in San Francisco
Films shot in San Francisco
1988 films
Films about nurses
1988 independent films
1980s American films